Gambela Airport  is an airport serving Gambela, the capital city of the Gambela Region in Ethiopia. The name of the city and airport may also be transliterated as Gambella. It also serves the Gambela National Park.

Facilities 

Airlines and destinations

References

External links 
 

Airports in Ethiopia
Gambela Region